In My Solitude: The Billie Holiday Songbook is a 1994 jazz album by American trumpeter Terence Blanchard and vocalist Jeanie Bryson, released on the Columbia label.

Critical reception
Scott Yanow of AllMusic stated: "Trumpeter Terence Blanchard's tribute to Billie Holiday is a rather melancholy and often downbeat affair. Sounding less original than usual (he displays a strong Wynton Marsalis influence and also hints at times at both Miles Davis and Thad Jones), there is little joy to these renditions of Lady Day material other than the second half of "I Cried for You." The trumpeter's arrangements for the unswinging string section is occasionally oppressive, sometimes border on muzak and tends to weigh down the music." Zan Stewart of the Los Angeles Times added "...Blanchard will explore an earlier era on "In My Solitude: The Billie Holiday Songbook" (Columbia), his fat, sassy trumpet tone accompanied by a string section".

Track listing

Personnel
 Terence Blanchard – trumpet, main performer
 Jeanie Bryson – vocals
 Bruce Barth – piano
 Chris Thomas – bass
 Troy Davis – drums

Chart performance

Footnotes

Terence Blanchard albums
1994 albums
Columbia Records albums
Billie Holiday tribute albums